Daybreak Pacific Ltd is a New Zealand film and television company.  It produces low-budget films and programmes for the local and international market, often in association with other production or financing companies.  It also known as Daybreak Pictures.

It is managed by brothers Grant Bradley and Dale G Bradley, who produce and direct much of the work.

Major productions

Chunuk Bair (1992)
Chunuk Bair is a film, based on Maurice Shadbolt's play Once on Chunuk Bair.  Set during the Gallipoli campaign of World War I, it follows the fortunes of one regiment attempting to hold Chunuk Bair.  It stars Robert Powell.

Ozzie (2001)
A family film about an Australian koala.  Starring Joan Collins and  Rachel Hunter.

Cast
 Spencer Breslin - Justin Morton
 Joan Collins - Max Happy
 Rachel Hunter - Beth Morton
 Ralf Moeller - Tank Emerson
 Peter Rowley - Buzz Maroni
 Bruce Allpress - Charlie Foster
 Anton Tennet - Darryl
 Steven Riley - Ngundi
 Beryl TeWiata - Secretary
 Daniel Millaire - Maitre'D

Treasure Island Kids (2004)
A film trilogy comprising: The Battle of Treasure Island, The Monster of Treasure Island and The Mystery of Treasure Island.  Starring Beth Allen Nicko Vella and directed by Michael Hurst and Gavin Scott.

Other productions
 Hot Shotz (children's television mini-series)
 Chill Factor
 God's Outlaw
 Repeat Performance
 Lost Valley
 Wild Blue
 No One Can Hear You (2001)
 Kid's World (2001)
 Route 9 (2001)
 Cupid's Prey (2002)
 Hope Ranch (2002)
 Terror Peak (2002)
 Vector File (2002)

References

Television production companies of New Zealand
Film production companies of New Zealand